Iman Perez (born 2 May 1999) is a French model and actress.

Early life
Perez was born in Paris. Her father, Vincent Perez, is a Swiss actor of German and Spanish origin. Her mother, Karine Silla, is a Senegalese-born French actress, film director, and screenwriter. She has one older half-sister, Roxane Depardieu – daughter of Gerard Depardieu, and a younger brother and sister – twins: Pablo and Tess Perez. Iman and her siblings grew up in Paris, and attended the International School of Paris which is why they are proficient in both French and English. However, she finished her school years online.

Career
Perez started her career as an actress, starring in her first movie in 2011. In 2015, she signed with her modeling agency Next Model Management, and a few months later, she was one of the 21 young girls selected to participate in the 2015 edition of the Bal des débutantes in Paris. She had since become Jean Paul Gaultier muse.

She worked for numerous fashion and women's magazines such as Flaunt, Harper's Bazaar, L'Officiel, Madame Figaro, and Vogue. Perez has posed for the likes of Peter Lindbergh and Paolo Roversi. She has worked with brands such as Chloé, Dior, H&M, Hermès, Longines, and Zadig & Voltaire. Throughout the years, Perez has grown as a model, and is considered to be a "it girl" and "top model" to quote numerous tabloid magazines.

Equestrian
Perez is also a horse rider, competing in international shows in Europe. She started competing at the age of seven. Starting in 2016, she has been riding under the colors of Renault in international shows. In November 2017, it has been announced that Perez was the face of Miasuki (an elite equestrian clothing brand) and is currently riding under their colors. She rides alongside other celebrities such as Jessica Springsteen, Jennifer Gates (daughter of Bill and Melinda Gates) and French actor Guillaume Canet.

Filmography
 2011 – Un Baiser Papillon, directed by Karine Silla  – role: Fleur

References

External links

French female models
21st-century French actresses
1999 births
Living people
Actresses from Paris
French film actresses
French people of German descent
French people of Senegalese descent
French people of Spanish descent
French people of Swiss descent